Ravila is a small borough in Kose Parish, Harju County in northern Estonia.

Ravila Manor
Ravila was first referred to as the location of a manor in 1469. A later baroque building was burned down during the Revolution of 1905, and only the grand granite stairs facing the park survives from that building. It was rebuilt shortly afterwards, but smaller and in a Baroque Revival architecture|neo-Baroque style. It was the home of writer Peter August Friedrich von Manteuffel. In the late 1800s Ravila Manor was managed by Alexander Otto Lesthal who lived in the adjacent Governor's House. Estonian photographer Arthur Lesthal was born in the Governor's House as well as his brother, Eesti Lloyd insurance director Paul Lesthal.

References

External links
Kose Parish 
Ravila Külaselts 
Ravila at Estonian Manors Portal
Ravila mõis 

Boroughs and small boroughs in Estonia
Kreis Harrien
Manor houses in Estonia